The Battle of Noáin or the Battle of Esquiroz, fought on 30 June 1521 was the only open field battle in the Spanish conquest of Iberian Navarre. It was a decisive victory for the Spanish against the Franco-Navarrese army.

Prelude 
Navarre had been invaded by Ferdinand II of Aragon in 1512, and the portion south of the Pyrenees was annexed to Castile in 1515, so becoming a kingdom part of the Crown of Castile. After John III's 1516 failed reconquest attempt, his son and legitimate heir apparent to the throne of Navarre, Henry II, saw an option through to reconquer the kingdom now the Castilian army was busy dealing with the Revolt of the Comuneros.

He sent a large French/Navarrese army commanded by General André de Foix, Lord of Lesparre, (or Asparros or Esparre) across the Pyrenees, consisting of 12,000 infantry, 800 mounted knights, and 29 pieces of artillery. With the support of the population, in less than three weeks, all of Navarre was conquered. The only opposition came from Ignatius of Loyola's Castilian garrison of Pamplona. He in turn was severely wounded, trying in vain to defend the city castle. The army then moved into Castile, besieging Logroño.

In the meantime the Revolt of the Comuneros had been crushed at the Battle of Villalar in April, and the Spanish were able to gather a huge army of 25,000 men and moved on Navarre. On June 11, Lesparre abandoned his siege of Logroño and retreated back into Navarre. On June 30, both armies met in front of Pamplona.

The battle
The battle was fought in the extended plains between Noáin and Pamplona. The Spanish troops had grown to more the 30,000 men under command of Iñigo Fernández de Velasco, Constable of Castile and the Duke of Nájera, viceroy of Navarre.

Despite being seriously outnumbered 3 to 1, the Franco-Navarrese attacked, surprising the Spanish and gaining some initial success. But then Fadrique Enríquez, Admiral of Castile, moved his cavalry across the Sierra de Erreniega and fell upon the Franco-Navarrese rear guard.

The bloody battle continued for several hours, but finally the bulk of the Franco-Navarrese was forced to surrender after suffering an estimated 5,000 casualties. André de Foix, wounded in the eyes, was amongst the prisoners. He was later released for a large ransom.

Aftermath 
This battle decided for good the future of Navarre as part of the Kingdom of Spain. The rest of the country was reconquered in the following days without meeting any resistance. Lower Navarre remained out of the reach of the Spanish at first, but suffered further Spanish inroads and on-off occupation during the next 7 years. In September 1521, King of Navarre Henry II backed by Francis I of France struck back with another mixed Franco-Navarrese expedition, this time targeting north of Navarre (Baztan), and Navarre's way out to the ocean, Hondarribia (Fuenterrabía), between 1521 and 1524, but without permanent success. Navarre remained a matter of international dispute and home to sporadic cross-border clashes still for a century, up to the reign of Henry III of Navarre (Henry IV of France).

There is today a monument on the battlefield, where on the last Sunday of June, supporters for the independence of Navarre meet every year.

References

Sources

Conflicts in 1521
Noain
Noain
Noain
16th century in Navarre
Basque history
Italian War of 1521–1526